The Australian Elizabethan Theatre Trust is a theatre and performing arts company that was founded in September 1954, with the aim of establishing drama, opera and ballet companies nationally.

Founding 
In 1954 the Australian Elizabethan Theatre Trust was established under the guidance of H.C. Coombs, Governor of the Commonwealth Bank, sir Charles Moses GM of the Australian Broadcasting Commission and John Douglas Pringle of the Sydney Morning Herald" to provide a theatre of Australians by Australians for Australians". Named to commemorate Queen Elizabeth II's visit to Australia, the Trust raised £100,000 by a public appeal. The Trust had an agreement with the Commonwealth government to match public donations 'in the ratio of 1:3 and to provide ongoing funding'. With substantial contributions from both the public and the Commonwealth Government, the Trust commemorated the first visit of the Queen, who had taken the title "Queen of Australia" in 1953, and since then The Trust has been the only arts body to bear her name.

The hope in 1954 was that there would occur in the arts a new "Elizabethan" age, and as productive as the first in the sixteenth century.

Development of and support for performing arts 
The Trust has nurtured and seen to independence many of Australia's most significant performing arts companies including Opera Australia and the Australian Ballet Foundation. The Trust also formed, maintained and administered two music Opera and Ballet orchestras, one each in Sydney and Melbourne, to accompany ballet and opera companies, and one smaller orchestra of Sydney freelance musicians named the Elizabethan Sinfonietta.

The Trust played a key role in establishing high culture in Australia through its involvement in setting up:
 The Elizabethan Theatre Trust Opera Company (now Opera Australia) in 1956
 The Elizabethan Opera Ballet Company, a short lived ballet company set up in 1957, and with J. C. Williamson Ltd the Australian Ballet Foundation in 1961 and the Australian Ballet School under the direction of Margaret Scott
 The Elizabethan Trust Orchestra in 1967, which in 1969 expanded into two orchestras, one each resident in Melbourne and Sydney. These orchestras became the Australian Opera and Ballet Orchestra in 1991, and State Orchestra of Victoria in 1986. The SOV has since been renamed Orchestra Victoria
It has also supported:
 National Institute of Dramatic Art (NIDA)
 Marionette Theatre of Australia
 Australian Theatre of the Deaf
 Old Tote Theatre Company
 Melbourne Theatre Company
 South Australian Theatre Company.

Following the establishment of the Australia Council for the Arts in 1968, it ceased to be a funding body for opera and ballet in 1970.

In 1974, Geoffrey Wynter Armstrong bequeathed a sum of money to the Trust to establish a memorial fund to be known as the Geoffrey Wynter Armstrong and Elizabeth Mary Martin Scholarship. The annual award is currently administered by Music & Opera Singers Trust Limited.

In 1982 it helped to fund the tour of Aboriginal playwright Bob Merritt's play The Cake Man to the World Theatre Festival in Denver, Colorado.

Change in focus 
During the 1980s the Trust scaled back its operations and in the 1990s had a Sydney focus and operated a ticketing agency and organised theatre parties.

In 1990, the Trust went into provisional receivership and its operations were scaled back by its Administrator. Its arts promotion role passed to the Australian Council for the Arts (later the Australia Council).[4] Management of The Trust was given back to the Directors in 1992.

In 2000, the Trust launched its international music scholarship program for Australian singers, musicians and conductors wishing to undertake overseas music study. This assists musicians, singers and conductors in all music genres in making a unique, original and valuable contribution to Australian culture.

Since 2000 there have been 107 music scholarships awarded with a total value of $1,337,559. Of these there have been 29 awards to singers for study in The Netherlands, UK, France, USA, Germany and Italy. Musicians have received awards for chamber music, orchestral and solo study in UK, Europe and USA. There are no restrictions on scholars applying for further assistance and it is the Trust's view that it should stand by and support, when practical, a scholars' musical development for life.

In 2004 the Trust purchased the Independent Theatre at North Sydney and undertook a major acoustical and heritage refurbishment of the venue. This initiative resulted in the production of a fine chamber music venue with an outstanding acoustic quality for both performers and audience. The Trust sold the Independent in 2013 to Wenona School who have continued the chamber music programs.

Chairs of the Board
H. C. Coombs (founding chair)
Aubrey Gibson (1966-1972)
James Darling (1973-1975)
Ian Potter (1975-1982)
David Griffin (1982)
Andrew Briger (1983-1989)
James Strong (1989-1990)
Hon. Lloyd D. S. Waddy (1992 – current)

See also
Australian Opera and Ballet Orchestra
Orchestra Victoria
Regional Arts Australia

References
THE TRUST the rise and fall of an Australian icon by Brian Adams (amazon.com.au) charts the history of The Australian Elizabethan Theatre Trust as told by its foundation members in extensive interviews with Brian Adams, former ABC TV Arts head. The book provides an authentic insight into the challenges and triumphs of this cultural icon, and its subsequent spawning of the independent performing arts companies of today and their educational institutions.

The Australian Elizabethan Theatre Trust: the first year, Sydney: The Australian Elizabethan Theatre Trust, 1956
Stephen Alomes, The search for a National Theatre, Voices, Spring 1993, pp. 21–37.

External links
Australian Elizabethan Theatre Trust website

MS 5908 Records of Australian Elizabethan Theatre Trust at the National Library of Australia

Organisations based in Sydney
Performing arts in Australia
Theatre companies in Australia